Madurai Adheenam is the oldest Saivite adheenam (also known as a matha or mutt), a form of Hindu monastery, in South India. It was established more than 1,300 years ago, and is said to have been rejuvenated by Thirugnana Sambandar. It is located near the  Meenakshi Amman Temple in Madurai, Tamil Nadu, one of the most important Shiva–Shakti shrines. It is an active centre of Saiva Siddhanta philosophy.

The Mutt is headed by Sri La Sri Harihara Sri Gnanasambanda Desika Swamigal who took over as the 293rd pontiff of the Madurai Adheenam, at a grand coronation ceremony that took place on 23 August 2021. The Mutt also administers four temples in Thanjavur district and Tiruvarur district, namely Agniswarar Temple, Kanjanur, Sakshinatheswarar Temple, Thiruppurambiyam, Kaichinam Kaichineswarar Temple and Pannakaparanar temple.

Religious activities
The Mutt is located in South Avani Moola street, close to Meenakshi Amman temple in Madurai. The Adheenam is involved in publishing Saivite literature, specifically Thevaram and Tiruvasakam and its translations. It is also involved in literary scholarship. The Adheenam along with Thiruppanandal Adheenam and Dharmapuram Adheenam were founded during the 16th century to spread the knowledge of Saiva Sidhantam. The Mutt offers Annadhanam (free meals) to devotees in its premises and also the four temples administered by them. The Mutt organizes special worship practices like Nithya and Maheswar Pooja.

Lineage
In 2016, Madurai Adheenam was headed by Srila Sri Arunagirinatha Gnanasambantha Desika Paramacharya, who is the 292nd Guru Maha Sannidhanam or Pontiff of the Aadheenm. Arunagirinatha had appointed V. Thirunavukarasu as Ilavarasu or successor, with the given holy name of Srila Sri Kumara Sundara Gnanasambanda Desika Paramacharya. In 2019, the Adheenam became the subject of a legal dispute when Arunagirinatha removed Kumara Sundara and appointed Srila Sri Harihara Gnanasambanda Desika Paramacharya as the new Ilavarasu, with the Saivaneri Meetpu Peravai filing a petition at the Madras High Court that alleged that Kumara Sundara has not been legally removed at the time of the new appointment.

The 27th head of Dharumai Adheenam, declared that junior pontiff Harihara Sri Gnanasambanda Desika Swamigal, who was appointed by Arunagirinatha on June 6, 2019, as his successor, would become the 293rd pontiff. Sri La Sri Harihara Sri Gnanasambanda Desika Swamigal took over as the 293rd pontiff of the Madurai Adheenam, at a grand coronation ceremony that took place on 23 August 2021. Sri La Sri Harihara Sri Gnanasambandha Desika Swamigal was born in a village called Udankudi in Tirunelveli. He became a saint when he was 21-years old. For about 39 years, he has held different positions in famous Shaivite mutts such as Kundrakudi Adheenam, Thiruvavadudurai Adheenam and Dharmapuram Adheenam.

Temples
The adheenam is the hereditary trustee of four temples in Thanjavur District.

References 

Hindu monasteries in India
Shaivism
Aadheenams